Welsh English comprises the dialects of English spoken by Welsh people. The dialects are significantly influenced by Welsh grammar and often include words derived from Welsh. In addition to the distinctive words and grammar, a variety of accents are found across Wales, including those of North Wales, the Cardiff dialect, the South Wales Valleys and West Wales.

Accents and dialects in the west of Wales have been more heavily influenced by the Welsh language while dialects in the east have been influenced more by dialects in England. In the east and south east, it has been influenced by West Country and West Midland dialects while in north east Wales and parts of the North Wales coast, it has been influenced by Merseyside English.

A colloquial portmanteau word for Welsh English is Wenglish. It has been in use since 1985.

Pronunciation

Vowels

Short monophthongs
 The vowel of cat  is pronounced either as an open front unrounded vowel  or a more central near-open front unrounded vowel . In Cardiff, bag is pronounced with a long vowel . In Mid-Wales, a pronunciation resembling its New Zealand and South African analogue is sometimes heard, i.e. trap is pronounced 
 The vowel of end  is a more open vowel and thus closer to cardinal vowel  than RP
 In Cardiff, the vowel of "kit"  sounds slightly closer to the schwa sound of above, an advanced close-mid central unrounded vowel 
 The vowel of "bus"  is usually pronounced [~] and is encountered as a hypercorrection in northern areas for foot. It is sometimes manifested in border areas of north and mid Wales as an open front unrounded vowel . It also manifests as a near-close near-back rounded vowel  without the foot–strut split in northeast Wales, under influence of Cheshire and Merseyside accents, and to a lesser extent in south Pembrokeshire.
The uncertainty over which vowel to use often leads to 'hypercorrections' involving the schwa, e.g. programme is often pronounced

Long monophthongs

 The trap-bath split is variable in Welsh English, especially among social status. In some varieties such as Cardiff English, words like ask, bath, laugh, master and rather are usually pronounced with PALM while words like answer, castle, dance and nasty are normally pronounced with TRAP. On the other hand, the split may be completely absent in other varieties like Abercraf English.
 The vowel of car is often pronounced as an open central unrounded vowel  and more often as a long open front unrounded vowel 
 In broader varieties, particularly in Cardiff, the vowel of bird is similar to South African and New Zealand, i.e. a mid front rounded vowel 
An example that illustrates this tendency is the Abercrave pronunciation of play-place 

Diphthongs
 Fronting diphthongs tend to resemble Received Pronunciation, apart from the vowel of bite that has a more centralised onset 
 Backing diphthongs are more varied:
The vowel of low in RP, other than being rendered as a monophthong, like described above, is often pronounced as 
The word town is pronounced with a near-open central onset 
Welsh English is one of few dialects where the Late Middle English diphthong  never became , remaining as a falling diphthong . Thus you , yew , and ewe  are not homophones in Welsh English. As such yod-dropping never occurs: distinctions are made between choose  and chews , through  and threw , which most other English varieties do not have.

Consonants
 Most Welsh accents pronounce /r/ as an alveolar tap  (a 'tapped r'), similar to Scottish English and some Northern English and South African accents, in place of an approximant  like in most accents in England while an alveolar trill  may also be used under the influence of Welsh
 Welsh English is mostly non-rhotic, however variable rhoticity can be found in accents influenced by Welsh, especially northern varieties.
 H-dropping is common in many Welsh accents, especially southern varieties like Cardiff English, but is absent in northern and western varieties influenced by Welsh.
 Some gemination between vowels is often encountered, e.g. money is pronounced 
 As Welsh lacks the letter Z and the voiced alveolar fricative /z/, some first-language Welsh speakers replace it with the voiceless alveolar fricative /s/ for words like cheese and thousand, while pens and pence merge into , especially in north-west, west and south-west Wales.
 In northern varieties influenced by Welsh, chin and gin may also merge into 
 In the north-east, under influence of such accents as Scouse, ng-coalescence does not take place, so sing is pronounced 
 Also in northern accents,  is frequently strongly velarised . In much of the south-east, clear and dark L alternate much like they do in RP

Distinctive vocabulary and grammar

Examples of this include the use by some speakers of the tag question  regardless of the form of the preceding statement and the placement of the subject and the verb after the predicate for emphasis, e.g.  or 

The word  (probably related to "buddy") is used to mean "friend" or "mate".

There is no standard variety of English that is specific to Wales, but such features are readily recognised by Anglophones from the rest of the UK as being from Wales, including the (actually rarely used) phrase  which is a translation of a Welsh language tag.

The word  has been described as "one of the most over-worked Wenglish words" and can have a range of meanings including - fine or splendid, long, decent, and plenty or large amount. A  is a wash involving at least face and hands.

Code-switching
As Wales has become increasingly more anglicised, code-switching has become increasingly more common.

Examples
Welsh code-switchers fall typically into one of three categories: the first category is people whose first language is Welsh and are not the most comfortable with English, the second is the inverse, English as a first language and a lack of confidence with Welsh, and the third consists of people whose first language could be either and display competence in both languages.

Welsh and English share congruence, meaning that there is enough overlap in their structure to make them compatible for code-switching. In studies of Welsh English code-switching, Welsh frequently acts as the matrix language with English words or phrases mixed in. A typical example of this usage would look like dw i’n love-io soaps, which translates to "I love soaps".

In a study conducted by Margaret Deuchar in 2005 on Welsh-English code-switching, 90 per cent of tested sentences were found to be congruent with the Matrix Language Format, or MLF, classifying Welsh English as a classic case of code-switching. This case is identifiable as the matrix language was identifiable, the majority of clauses in a sentence that uses code-switching must be identifiable and distinct, and the sentence takes the structure of the matrix language in respect to things such as subject verb order and modifiers.

History of the English language in Wales
The presence of English in Wales intensified on the passing of the Laws in Wales Acts of 1535–1542, the statutes having promoted the dominance of English in Wales; this, coupled with the closure of the monasteries, which closed down many centres of Welsh education, led to decline in the use of the Welsh language.

The decline of Welsh and the ascendancy of English was intensified further during the Industrial Revolution, when many Welsh speakers moved to England to find work and the recently developed mining and smelting industries came to be manned by Anglophones. David Crystal, who grew up in Holyhead, claims that the continuing dominance of English in Wales is little different from its spread elsewhere in the world. The decline in the use of the Welsh language is also associated with the preference in the communities for English to be used in schools and to discourage everyday use of the Welsh language in them, including by the use of the Welsh Not in some schools in the 18th and 19th centuries.

Influence outside Wales
While other British English accents from England have affected the accents of English in Wales, especially in the east of the country, influence has moved in both directions. Accents in north-east Wales and parts of the North Wales coastline have been influenced by accents in North West England, accents in the mid-east have been influenced by accents in the West Midlands while accents in south-east Wales have been influenced by West Country English. In particular, Scouse and Brummie (colloquial) accents have both had extensive Anglo-Welsh input through migration, although in the former case, the influence of Anglo-Irish is better known.

Literature
 

"Anglo-Welsh literature" and "Welsh writing in English" are terms used to describe works written in the English language by Welsh writers. It has been recognised as a distinctive entity only since the 20th century. The need for a separate identity for this kind of writing arose because of the parallel development of modern Welsh-language literature; as such it is perhaps the youngest branch of English-language literature in the British Isles.

While Raymond Garlick discovered sixty-nine Welsh men and women who wrote in English prior to the twentieth century, Dafydd Johnston believes it is "debatable whether such writers belong to a recognisable Anglo-Welsh literature, as opposed to English literature in general". Well into the 19th century English was spoken by relatively few in Wales, and prior to the early 20th century there are only three major Welsh-born writers who wrote in the English language: George Herbert (1593–1633) from Montgomeryshire, Henry Vaughan (1622–1695) from Brecknockshire, and John Dyer (1699–1757) from Carmarthenshire.

Welsh writing in English might be said to begin with the 15th-century bard Ieuan ap Hywel Swrdwal (?1430 - ?1480), whose Hymn to the Virgin was written at Oxford in England in about 1470 and uses a Welsh poetic form, the awdl, and Welsh orthography; for example:

O mighti ladi, owr leding - tw haf
At hefn owr abeiding:
Yntw ddy ffast eferlasting
I set a braents ws tw bring.

A rival claim for the first Welsh writer to use English creatively is made for the diplomat, soldier and poet John Clanvowe (1341–1391).

The influence of Welsh English can be seen in the 1915 short story collection My People by Caradoc Evans, which uses it in dialogue (but not narrative); Under Milk Wood (1954) by Dylan Thomas, originally a radio play; and Niall Griffiths whose gritty realist pieces are mostly written in Welsh English.

See also
 Cardiff English
 Abercraf English
 Gower dialect
 Port Talbot English
 Welsh literature in English
 Regional accents of English speakers
 Gallo (Brittany)
 Scots language

Other English dialects heavily influenced by Celtic languages
 Anglo-Cornish
 Anglo-Manx
 Bungi creole
 Hiberno-English
 Highland English (and Scottish English)

References

Bibliography

Further reading

 
 

Parry, David, A Grammar and Glossary of the Conservative Anglo-Welsh Dialects of Rural Wales, The National Centre for English Cultural Tradition: introduction and phonology available at the Internet Archive.

External links
Sounds Familiar?Listen to examples of regional accents and dialects from across the UK on the British Library's 'Sounds Familiar' website
 Talk Tidy : John Edwards, Author of books and CDs on the subject "Wenglish".
 Some thoughts and notes on the English of south Wales : D Parry-Jones, National Library of Wales journal 1974 Winter, volume XVIII/4
 Samples of Welsh Dialect(s)/Accent(s) 
Welsh vowels
 David Jandrell: Introducing The Welsh Valleys Phrasebook

 
Welsh English
Languages of Wales
Dialects of English